Events in the year 1822 in Art.

Events
Nicéphore Niépce creates the first permanent photograph through his heliographic process.
The Mauritshuis in The Hague opens to the public as a state art museum.
Henry Raeburn is knighted and appointed royal limner.

Works

Lorenzo Bartolini – The Campbell Sisters dancing a Waltz (marble)
Eugène Delacroix – The Barque of Dante (first major work)
John Doyle – The Life of a Racehorse (prints)
William Etty – Youth on the Prow, and Pleasure at the Helm (first version)
Caspar David Friedrich
The Lonely Tree
Moonrise by the Sea
The Tree of Crows
Théodore Géricault – portraits of insane inmates of the Salpêtrière Hospital in Paris made for the psychiatrist Étienne-Jean Georget.
Insane Woman
Portrait of a Kleptomaniac
Jean-Baptiste Paulin Guérin – Anchises and Venus
Louis Hersent – Ruth
Orest Kiprensky – Portrait of Ekaterina Avdulina
Jérôme-Martin Langlois - Diana and Endymion 
Sir Thomas Lawrence – Portrait of Marguerite, Countess of Blessington
Louis-François, Baron Lejeune – Battle of Moscow, 7th September 1812
Guillaume Guillon-Lethière - The Oath of the Ancestors
John Martin – The Destruction of Pompeii and Herculaneum
Charles Willson Peale – The Artist in His Museum
Pierre Paul Prud'hon – Crucifixion
Pierre Révoil – Mary, Queen of Scots, Separated from Her Followers
John Trumbull – Surrender of General Burgoyne
Richard Westmacott – statue of Achilles (Wellington Monument, London)
David Wilkie – The Chelsea Pensioners reading the Waterloo Dispatch

Births
February 16 – Herman Frederik Carel ten Kate, Dutch watercolorist (died 1891)
March 16 – Rosa Bonheur, French animal painter (died 1899)
May 18? – Mathew Brady, American photographer (died 1896)
June 1 – Clementina Maude, Viscountess Hawarden, née Clementina Elphinstone Fleeming, British portrait photographer (died 1865)
August 27 – Theodor Martens, German painter (died 1884)
October 7 – Francis Frith, English topographical photographer (died 1898)

Deaths
January 14 – Franz Kobell, German painter, etcher and draftsman (born 1749)
January 22 – Rudolph Schadow, German sculptor (born 1786)
February 11 – Arthur William Devis, English painter of history paintings and portraits (born 1762)
March 23 – Charles Clément Balvay, French engraver mainly working in intaglio and exclusively in burin (born 1756)
April 3 – Friedrich Justin Bertuch, German patron of the arts (born 1747)
April 17 – Dmitry Levitzky, Russian-Ukrainian portrait painter (born 1735)
May 6 – Charles Peale Polk, American portrait painter (born 1767)
May 11 – Gerard van Spaendonck, Dutch painter (born 1746)
May 19 (bur.) – Daniel Havell, English engraver (born 1785)
September 24 - Achille Etna Michallon, French landscape painter (born 1796)
October 9 - Richard Earlom, English engraver  (born 1742)
October 13 – Antonio Canova, Italian sculptor (born 1757)
October 25 – James Sowerby, English naturalist and illustrator (born 1757)
November 17 – Joaquim Machado de Castro, Portuguese sculptor  (born 1731)
December 10 – Bertrand Andrieu, French engraver and medalist (born 1761)
December 28 – Albert Christoph Dies, German painter and composer (born 1755)
date unknown
Pierre Audouin, French engraver (born 1768)
Antoine Cardon, also known as Cardon the Elder, Belgian painter, portraitist and engraver (born 1739)
Kim Deuk-sin, Korean painter, official painter of the Joseon court (born 1754)
Nathaniel Plimer, English miniaturist (born 1757)
Mariano Ramón Sánchez, Spanish painter primarily of portrait miniatures (born 1740)

References

 
Years of the 19th century in art
1820s in art